Garvin Davis (born 1 May 1947) is a Bahamian boxer. He competed in the men's welterweight event at the 1972 Summer Olympics. At the 1972 Summer Olympics, he lost to Maurice Hope of Great Britain.

Davis also represented the Bahamas at the 1974 Central American and Caribbean Games in the welterweight category.

References

External links
 

1947 births
Living people
Welterweight boxers
Bahamian male boxers
Olympic boxers of the Bahamas
Boxers at the 1972 Summer Olympics
Competitors at the 1974 Central American and Caribbean Games
Place of birth missing (living people)